Chromodoris briqua is a species of colourful sea slug, a dorid nudibranch, a marine gastropod mollusc in the family Chromodorididae.

Distribution
This species was described from Eniwetok Atoll, Marshall Islands.

Description
Chromodoris briqua can reach a length of 30–50 mm. It may be a synonym of Hypselodoris whitei.

References

Chromodorididae
Gastropods described in 1965